The 2011 WAC men's basketball tournament was held March 9–12 at the Orleans Arena in Paradise, Nevada to crown a champion of the Western Athletic Conference. The tournament was won by Utah State for their 2nd WAC tournament title to earn an automatic bid to the 2011 NCAA Men's Division I Basketball Tournament.

Format
The top eight teams in the conference qualified for the tournament. The top two seeds received byes into the semi-finals while the 3 and 4 seeds received byes into the quarter-finals. The two quarter-finals games were broadcast on ESPNU. The semi-final involving the 2 seed and the championship game was broadcast by ESPN2.

Bracket
All Times Pacific.
Rankings from the AP Poll.

References

Tournament
WAC men's basketball tournament
WAC men's basketball tournament
WAC men's basketball tournament
Basketball competitions in the Las Vegas Valley
College basketball tournaments in Nevada
College sports tournaments in Nevada